The Chronicle, also known as the Two Rivers Chronicle, was a weekly newspaper published in Two Rivers, Manitowoc County, Wisconsin, from 1872 to 1927. From 1872 to 1899 it was called the Manitowoc County Chronicle, changing its name in 1899 to simply The Chronicle. In 1927 it merged with the rival Two Rivers Reporter to form the Reporter-Chronicle, which itself was purchased in 1970 by the Manitowoc Herald-Times to become The Herald Times Reporter.

References 

Manitowoc County, Wisconsin
Newspapers published in Wisconsin
Publications disestablished in 1927
Publications established in 1872
1872 establishments in Wisconsin
1927 disestablishments in Wisconsin
Defunct weekly newspapers